Eugene Kandel (born in 1959, Moscow) is an Israeli economist, the CEO of the Start-Up Nation Central, and an Emil Spyer Professor of Economics and Finance at the Hebrew University of Jerusalem.

Biography
Eugene Kandel is the older of two sons of Felix Kandel, one of the authors of the highly-popular Soviet-era animated series Nu, pogodi!.
Kandel holds a BA and an MA from the Hebrew University, and an MBA and a PhD from the Graduate School of Business at the University of Chicago.

Academic and civic career
From 1989 to 1997 Kandel was a professor of economics at the William Simon Graduate School of Business at the University of Riocheter. Since 1997 he is a professor of Economics and Finance at the Hebrew University in Jerusalem. 

Kandel was actively involved in the 1997 redesign of the Nasdaq trading rules. He served as Editor and Associate Editor of leading academic Finance journals, and as a Chairman of investment committees for pension and provident funds in Israel. Kandel consulted international agencies, and corporations. 

In 2009 he was appointed as the Chairman of Israel's National Economic Council and the Economic Advisor to the Prime Minister Benjamin Netanyahu and was asked to serve the second term when his first four-year term ended in 2013. He played a central role in all major decisions on economic policy during that time, chaired and participated in major committees. 

Kandel is a member of the Center for the Study of Rationality at the Hebrew University, a research fellow of the Center for Economic Policy and Research in London, and a Fellow of the European Corporate Governance Institute.

He is the founder of the Center for Financial Markets and Institutions, and established the elite MA program in Finance and Financial Economics of the Hebrew University.
  
Kandel's primary area of academic expertise is Financial Markets and Financial Intermediaries. His research was published in the world leading Finance and Economics journals.

Since 2015, Prof. Kandel serves as the CEO of Start-Up Nation Central (https://www.startupnationcentral.org/) a non-profit organization that builds bridges between the world's challenges and the Israei technological innovation that can help address them.

Selected published works
 Kandel, E. (2009), In Search of Reasonable Executive Compensation, CESIfo Economic Studies 55(3–4), 405–433.
 Kandel, E., Goldstein, M., Irvine, P. & Wiener, Z. (2009), Brokerage Commissions and Institutional Trades, Financial Studies 22 (12): 5175–5212.  
 Kandel, E., Bondaryuk, A., Massa, M. & Simonov, A. (2008), Portfolio Diversification and the Decision to Go Public, The Review of Financial Studies 21(4), 2779–2824. 
 Kandel, E., Guttman, I. & Kadan, O. (2006), A Rational Expectation Theory of Kinks in Financial Reporting, The Accounting Review 81(4), 811–848.  
 Kandel, E., Foucault, T. & Kadan, O. (2005), Limit Order Book as a Market for Liquidity, The Review of Financial Studies 18(4), 1171–1217.  
 Kandel, E. & Pearson, N. (2002), Option Value, Uncertainty and the Investment Decision, Journal of Financial and Quantitative Analyses 37(2), 341–374.
 Kandel, E. & Simhon, A. (2002), Between Search and Walras, The Journal of Labor Economics 20(1), 59–86 
 Kandel, E. & Pearson, N. (2001), Flexibility vs. Commitment in Personnel Management, The Journal of Japanese and International Economics 15(4), 515–556.  
 Kandel, E. & Zilberfarb, B. (1999), Differential Interpretation of Information in Inflation Forecasts, The Review of Economics and Statistics 81(2), 217–226.  
 Kandel, E. & Marx, L. (1999), Payment for Order Flow on Nasdaq, Journal of Finance 54(1), 35–66.   
 Kandel, E., Barclay, M., Christie, W., Harris, J. & Schultz, P. (1999), Effect of Market Reform on the Trading Cost and Depths of Nasdaq Stocks, Journal of Finance 54(1), 1–34.  
 Kandel, E. & Marx, L. (1999), Odd Eighths Avoidance as a Defense Against SOES Bandits, Journal of Financial Economics 51(1), 85–102.  
 Kandel, E., Barclay, M. & Marx, L. (1998), The Effect of Transaction Costs on Stock Prices and Trading Volume, Journal of Financial Intermediation 7(1), 130150 (lead article). 
 Kandel, E. & Marx, L. (1997), Nasdaq Market Structure and Spread Patterns, Journal of Financial Economics 45, 61–89.  
 Kandel, E. (1996), The Right to Return, Journal of Law and Economics 39(1), 329–355. 
 Kandel, E. & Pearson, N. (1995), Differential Interpretation of Information and Trade in Speculative markets, Journal of Political Economy 103(4), 831–872.  
 Kandel, E. & Lazear, E. (1992), Peer Pressure and Partnerships, Journal of Political Economy 100(4), 801–817.

See also
Economy of Israel

References

1959 births
Israeli economists
Israeli civil servants
Living people
Hebrew University of Jerusalem alumni
University of Chicago Booth School of Business alumni